"The Moon Is Still Over Her Shoulder" is a song written by  Hugh Prestwood, and recorded by American country pop artist Michael Johnson.  It was released in January 1987 as the third single from the album Wings.  The song was Johnson's second and last number one on the country chart and his follow up to "Give Me Wings".  The single went to number one for one week and spent a total of fifteen weeks on the country chart.

Charts

Weekly charts

Year-end charts

References
 

1987 singles
1986 songs
Michael Johnson (singer) songs
Songs written by Hugh Prestwood
RCA Records singles
Song recordings produced by Brent Maher